The 2017 Richmond Spiders football team represented the University of Richmond in the 2017 NCAA Division I FCS football season. They were led by first-year head coach Russ Huesman and played their home games at E. Claiborne Robins Stadium. The Spiders were a member of the Colonial Athletic Association.  They finished the season 6–5, 4–4 in CAA play to finish in sixth place.

Coaching change
Russ Huesman, who previously served as defensive coordinator for the Spiders from 2004–2008 including the Spiders' national championship year of 2008, returned to the program after serving as head coach at Chattanooga for eight seasons. He replaced Danny Rocco, who served as head coach of the Spiders for five seasons before taking the same position at Delaware.

Schedule

Source: Schedule

Game summaries

at Sam Houston State

at Colgate

Howard

Elon

Albany

at Towson

at Delaware

Stony Brook

at Villanova

at James Madison

William & Mary

Ranking movements

References

Richmond
Richmond Spiders football seasons
Richmond Spiders football